Bachman and Forry Tobacco Warehouse is a historic tobacco warehouse located at Columbia in Lancaster County, Pennsylvania. It was built between 1893 and 1895, and is a 3 1/2-story, rectangular brick building with a gable roof. It sits on a stone foundation and measures 54 feet by 85 feet.

It was listed on the National Register of Historic Places in 1979.

References 

Commercial buildings on the National Register of Historic Places in Pennsylvania
Commercial buildings completed in 1895
Buildings and structures in Lancaster County, Pennsylvania
Tobacco buildings in the United States
National Register of Historic Places in Lancaster County, Pennsylvania
Individually listed contributing properties to historic districts on the National Register in Pennsylvania
1895 establishments in Pennsylvania